Dzorwulu is the capital of the Ayawaso West Municipal District, a district of the Greater Accra Region of Ghana. Dzorwulu and North Dzorwulu are separated by the Tema Motorway.
It also host quite popular places like Aphrodisiac Nite Club, Peter Pan Restaurant, Royal Fiesta Hotel, Palace Chinese Restaurant etc. .There is only two government school in Dzorwulu which is  Dzorwulu A&B primary school and Bethany Methodist basic school.

References

Populated places in the Greater Accra Region